For non-officer ranks in Denmark, see:
Ranks and insignia of Royal Danish Army
Ranks and insignia of Royal Danish Navy
Ranks and insignia of Royal Danish Air Force

Disambiguation pages with (qualified) titles